Fishermans Paradise may refer to the following places:

Fishermans Paradise, New South Wales, Australia, town in the South Coast Region
Fishermans Paradise, Pennsylvania, USA, fishing site in Centre County